Birth of a Man is a 2002 South Korean film starring Jung Joon, Hong Kyung-in and Yeo Hyun-soo.

Production
The team was helped by a legendary Korean boxer Hong Soo-hwan regarding the boxing scenes in the film.

Cast 
 Jung Joon as Jang Dae-seong
 Hong Kyung-in as Lim Man-goo
 Yeo Hyun-soo as Kim Hae-sam
 Lee Won-jong 
 Kim Sa-rang as Sa-rang
 Lee Jae-yong as Mr. Choi

Plot
To accomplish the 99-year-old grandfather's dream of sending young people to university, three men practice boxing to enroll as a boxing student for university.

Reception
The film was pulled out in a day from theaters citing low performances despite being well received by 10,000 people in its test screening. The decision to pull out only in a day was criticized, and some even made an internet community for the movie to be offered more screenings.

References

External links 
 
 
 man born - and then the movie
 man born - mubiseuteu
Making film for 'Birth of a Man'

2002 films
2000s sports drama films
2000s Korean-language films
South Korean sports drama films
Films directed by Park Hee-jun
2002 drama films
2000s South Korean films